Squash bug is a common name for several insects in the family Coreidae and may refer to:

Acanthocoris scabrator
Anasa tristis, native to North America